The 1980 Arkansas gubernatorial election was a biennial election for the governorship of Arkansas. 

It was only that state's third election since Reconstruction when a Republican candidate won the governorship.

One-term Democratic Governor of Arkansas and future President Bill Clinton was narrowly defeated by Republican Frank D. White, which made Clinton, as he joked, "the youngest ex-governor in the nation." Clinton ran again two years later and regained the governorship, continuing to serve until he was elected to the presidency in 1992. Both the Democratic and Republican primaries were held on May 27.

Democratic primary

Candidates
 Bill Clinton, incumbent governor
 Monroe Schwarzlose, candidate for governor in 1978 and Republican candidate for the Arkansas House of Representatives in 1974

Results

Republican primary

Candidates
 Marshall Chrisman, former state representative
 Frank D. White, Savings and Loan executive and former head of the Arkansas Industrial Development Commission

Results

Campaign
Schwarzlose's unexpected strong challenge in primaries and his 31 percent of the primary vote foreshadowed that Clinton could be in trouble for the upcoming general election.

Clinton's increase in the cost of automobile registration tags was also unpopular. He was also hurt by President Jimmy Carter's decision to send thousands of Cuban refugees, some unruly, to a detention camp at Fort Chaffee, outside Fort Smith in Sebastian County in western Arkansas. (See Mariel boatlift.)

1980 general election was marked by decisive Republican victories—the GOP won the White House, a majority in United States Senate and 34 seats in the United States House of Representatives. Clinton's narrow loss was viewed as part of Reagan's coattails.

Result
Frank White narrowly won the election.

Effect
After Clinton lost the election in 1980, Max Brantley said: "The guy was like a death in the family. He was really destroyed after that election". Rudy Moore also added: "He never blamed anybody else. He accepted the responsibility. He didn't whine about it. In fact, it was within days, we were trying to figure out what we could to do to improve his political life after that"

After Clinton was defeated, an opportunity arose in which Clinton would lead the Democratic National Committee through the 1980s to battle Ronald Reagan and the Republicans, instead of running for another term for Governor of Arkansas. When Clinton campaigned for election in 1982 against White, he explained that he had learned the importance of adaptability and compromise from his defeat in two years prior.

During the campaign of 1982, Clinton promised to make major strides in education, including a large investment of public money, and avoided saying he would raise taxes.

There was some skepticism on whether Clinton's record on the economy in Arkansas would translate into Democrats losing in upcoming elections. The regular legislative session in Arkansas of 1985 was devoted to economic development. The legislature approved almost all of Clinton's program, which included changes in banking laws, start-up money for technology-oriented businesses, and large tax incentives for Arkansas industries that expanded their production and jobs. Arkansas was one of the best states in new job creation in the next six years, but most of the jobs did not pay high wages, and it remained one of the worst states in average income. Democrats wanted a counter to Reaganomics but feared Clinton's plan would lead to more unhappy blue collar workers bolting to the Republicans, as his plan offered no real solution to stagnant wages.

See also
1980 United States presidential election in Arkansas

References

Gubernatorial
1980
Arkansas
Bill Clinton